Tamil Kadavul Murugan is a 2017 Tamil-language mythology soap opera based on the life of the Hindu deity Murugan. This show is now the big budgeted series on Tamil television after Yaaradi Nee Mohini and Nandini. It started airing on 2 October 2017 on Vijay TV on every Monday to Friday at 21:00 (IST) replacing Bigg Boss Tamil. On 29 January 2018, the show timings changed to Monday through Friday at 18:00 (IST). The show season 1 was ended with 104 episodes from 23 February 2018. Season 2 was aired from 5 May 2018 to 19 May 2018 only on Hotstar for 15 Episodes.

Plot and story
This story shows about the life of Lord Murugan and about the Asura Surapadma. And this story will end with Sura Samhaaram.

Surapadman and his sister Aja Mukhi caused endless troubles to Murugan in his childhood. He sent countless asuras to destroy Murugan but all in vain. Murugan escaped each time when they tried to destroy him.

Murugan's childhood - Season 1

Murugan was created from Shiva's third eye and 6 sparks flew out and became babies on the Saravana River. Karthigai Women brought up Murugan( in the form of six children). They taught Asthras and Shastras to Murugan. Later on, Goddess Parvati became the mother when she joined the six children and that's how Murugan is known as Arumugam. Later the six Karthigai Women were blessed and became the Krithigai Nakshatram.

During one episode, Narada brought a Gnanapazham(ஞானப்பழம்) or Fruit of Knowledge and said that this competition is between Murugan and Ganesha. In this competition who goes around bhoomi or the Earth 3 times would win this fruit. Murugan started this journey while Ganesha didn't start. He started to go around his parents Shiva and Parvati 3 times (As circulating them is equal to rounding the earth). After Murugan finished the contest and returned to get the prize, he was disappointed with what Ganesha did. He was very angry with him and his parents. So he left Kailayam to find a place for himself with peace and he headed south – Tamil Nadu. He then found a place for himself, which is Palani(பழனி). Devas blessed him there and that place became divine place. At a stage, Tamil poet Nakkeeran and other poets were captured by Andasuran. He was an Asura who wanted his own language Karkhimukhi Jwala to exist. So he opposed Tamil-language and its popularity. Murugan fought with that Asura and helped Tamil poets get freedom. As a result of this, Tamil kings like Pallavas and Cholas praised him as Tamizh Kadavul Murugan or God of Tamils as he was the saviour of Tamil language.

To make Murugan to return to Kailayam, Shiva sent Avvaiyar Paati to convince Murugan. And when Murugan saw Avvaiyar, he tested her with some questions. When she asked about him and his problems, Murugan said everything that happened. So, Avvaiyar praised and advised Murugan. He then got convinced and realized his mistake and then returned to Kailayam.

Sura Samhaaram
Slowly, Murugan became an adult to be capable of fighting with Asuras. He sought the blessings of his parents, Parvati and Shiva. He then proceeded towards Mayapuri and invited Surapadma. In this battle, he fought with Tarakasuran and finally he killed him. Unable to bear his brother's death, Surapadma sent Kavundasuran to encounter Murugan. Murugan discussed war tactics with Devas and that Asura was also killed.

Other Devas were worried about their victory. They pleaded with Shiva and Shiva called for Veerabaahu to support Murugan in the war. Veerabahu requested Surapadman to avoid the war. But Surapadman refused his request. The battle continued. After a day of battle, Parvati gifted Murugan with a Sakthivel.

In the last day of battle, Murugan, with the help of Devas and Veerabahu, killed Surapadman.

Seasons overview

Cast

Master Anirudh as Murugan
 Pavan Madhukar as Adult Murugan
 Sasindhar Pushpalingam as Shiva /Veerabhadra
 Priya Prince as Goddess Parvathi / Durga / Adi Parashakti / Dakshayani
 Raksha Holla as Ajamukhi
 Nizam as Singhamukhan
 Mukesh kanna as Hiranyakashipu
 Dev Saran/ Tirth Solanki as Lord Ganesha
 Jaswant Sivakumar as Vishnu
 Ananth as Brahma
 Jaya Lakshmi as Mahalakshmi
 Ammu Ramachandran as Saraswati
 --- as Sage Agasthya
 --- as Narada Muni
 Priyadarshini as Ganga
 Krish as Devendran
 Srikumar as Agnidevan
 Rakesh Venugopal as Vayudevan
 Nagashree  as Indrani
 Dinesh Shyam as Nandhi
 Rizwan Daul as Jayanta
 Rashmi Raj as Nidardani
 R. K. as Dhakshan
 Ramesh Kumar as Yama
 --- as Nakkeran
 Arun Kumar Rajan as Veerabaahu(Episode 114–116)
 Kovai Kamala as Avvaiyar
 Nagaraj as Chitragupta
 --- as Idumban
 Subathira as Soorasai
 Sakthi Saravanan as Mahishasura
 Vetri Velan as Śūrapadmān
 --- as Banukopan
 Rihanshi Gowda / Meenakshi as Queen Padumakomalai
 Birla Bose as Tārakāsuran
 Harsha Sharma(child actor) as Ilvalan
 Design Raj as Asura Guru Shukracharyar
 Anandha Krishnan as Asura Senapathy *Uruthiran

Airing history
The show started airing on Vijay TV on 2 October 2017 and It aired on Monday through Friday at 9:00 pm (IST) to 10:00 pm (IST) for 1-hour episode. Later its timing changed starting from Monday, 25 December 2017, the show aired Monday through Friday at 9:00 pm, (IST) to 9:30 pm (IST) for 30 Minutes Episode Slot. A new show named Ninaika Therintha Manamae replaced this show at 9:30 pm (IST). On 29 January 2018, the show shifted to air Monday through Friday at 6:00 pm (IST) for the wishes of the audience. A new show named Kalyanamam Kalyanam replaced this show at 9:00 pm (IST).

Awards and nominations

Dubbed version
 This serial is dubbed in Malayalam language airing on Asianet TV as Sree Murugan from 23 October 2017 on Monday to Friday at 6:00PM (IST).
 In Telugu language aired on Maa TV from 12 February on Monday to Friday at 17:30 (IST) as Sri Subramanya Charitham.

References

External links
Official website at Hotstar

Star Vijay original programming
Tamil-language fantasy television series
Tamil-language historical television series
Tamil-language mythology soap operas
2010s Tamil-language television series
2017 Tamil-language television series debuts
Tamil-language television shows
2018 Tamil-language television series endings
Indian television series about Hindu deities